Simon Moore may refer to:
 Simon Moore (Royal Navy officer) (born 1946), former Royal Navy officer and former Assistant Chief of Defence Staff
 Simon Moore (judge), see Pitcairn sexual assault trial of 2004
 Simon Moore (writer), British screenplay writer
 Simon Moore (footballer) (born 1990), English football (soccer) goalkeeper 
 Simon Moore (Derbyshire cricketer) (born 1974), former English cricketer, played for Derbyshire in 1999 and 2003
 Simon Moore (Essex cricketer) (born 1973), English cricketer, played for Essex 2000–01